Gentle Julia is a 1936 American drama film directed by John G. Blystone and starring Jane Withers, Tom Brown and Marsha Hunt. It is an adaptation of the 1922 novel of the same title by Booth Tarkington.

Cast
 Jane Withers as Florence Atwater  
 Tom Brown as Noble Dill  
 Marsha Hunt as Julia Atwater 
 Jackie Searl as Herbert Livingston Atwater  
 Francis Ford as Tubbs, Fish Peddler  
 George Meeker as Crum  
 Maurice Murphy as Newland Sanders 
 Harry Holman as Grandpa Atwater  
 Myra Marsh as Mrs. Atwater  
 Hattie McDaniel as Kitty Silvers  
 Jackie Hughes as Henry Rooter  
 Eddie Buzard as Wallie Torbin 
 Frank Sully as Mr. Toms  
 Mary Alden as Aunt 
 Lynn Bari as Young Lady Outside Church / Jealous Girl at Dance 
 Mary Carr as Old Lady at Dance 
 Harvey Clark as Fat Man with Umbrella 
 John Dilson as Uncle  
 Grace Goodall as Aunt  
 Roger Gray as Policeman 
 Arthur Hoyt as Mr. Wainwright - Justice of the Peace  
 Marcia Mae Jones as Patty Fairchild  
 Jane Keckley as Neighbor at Dance  
 Frederick Lee in a minor role  
 Tom Ricketts as Old Man in Church / at Dance 
 Cyril Ring as Neighbor at Dance 
 Edwin Stanley as Mr. Atwater  
 Paul Stanton as Minister  
 Landers Stevens as Uncle
 Maidel Turner as Justice's Wife  
 Hilda Vaughn as Telephone Operator  
 Lois Verner as Choir Member  
 Niles Welch as Book Salesman  
 Florence Wix as Aunt Fannie

References

Bibliography
 Goble, Alan. The Complete Index to Literary Sources in Film. Walter de Gruyter, 1999.

External links
 

1936 films
1936 drama films
American drama films
Films based on works by Booth Tarkington
Films directed by John G. Blystone
20th Century Fox films
American black-and-white films
Films produced by Sol M. Wurtzel
Films with screenplays by Lamar Trotti
Films scored by Samuel Kaylin
1930s English-language films
1930s American films